Patricia Jorge may refer to:

Patricia Jorge (rhythmic gymnast), Portuguese gymnast
Patricia Gabriela Jorge, Argentine politician